The women's 200 metres event at the 1982 Commonwealth Games was held on 5 and 7 October at the QE II Stadium in Brisbane, Australia.

Medalists

Results

Heats
Qualification: First 4 in each heat (Q) and the next 2 fastest (q) qualify for the semifinals.

Wind:Heat 1: -2.2 m/s, Heat 2: -1.1 m/s, Heat 3: +0.3 m/s, Heat 4: ? m/s

Semifinals
Qualification: First 4 in each semifinal (Q) and the next 1 fastest (q) qualify for the final.

Wind:Heat 1: -3.9 m/s, Heat 2: -2.4 m/s

Final
Wind: +2.5 m/s

References

Heats & Semifinals results (The Sydney Morning Herald)
 Final results (The Sydney Morning Herald)
Heats & Semifinals results (The Canberra Times)
 Final results (The Canberra Times)
Australian results 

Athletics at the 1982 Commonwealth Games
1982